Major General (R) Jamshed Ayaz Khan, HI(M) was a Pakistani defence and security analyst and retired military general who has served as the president of the Institute of Regional Studies (IRS) think tank. Khan was also the Additional Secretary for Defence Production in the Ministry of Defence.

Career
He completed his education from the prestigious St Patrick's High School in Karachi, and from the Pakistan Military Academy in Kakul. Later, he obtained a master's degree in War Studies from the National Defence College.

He had written and spoken extensively for various media organisations and publications on issues relating to Pakistan's domestic geostrategic affairs as well as security and foreign policy. Khan was a supporter of Pakistan increasing its economic and geopolitical relations with Iran and other regional friends and has been a critic of American policies in the region.

He retired from the army in 2001 following a 39-year-long career. For his services in the army, he was awarded the Hilal-i-Imtiaz. He is a member of the International Institute for Strategic Studies in London, the Asia Society based in New York, and Rotary International. His name was listed in the International Who's Who list for 2006-07.

Publications
Texts authored by Jamshed Ayaz Khan include:
 Asia: Search for Security and Cooperation (2006)
 Reflections on Matters of War and Peace (2003)

References

External links
 Jamshed Ayaz Khan at Facebook
 Institute of Regional Studies

Articles and columns:
 Peace process — Is India serious?

Recipients of Hilal-i-Imtiaz
Living people
National Defence University, Pakistan alumni
Pakistani generals
Pakistani military writers
Pakistani political consultants
Pakistani Sunni Muslims
St. Patrick's High School, Karachi alumni
People from Islamabad
Year of birth missing (living people)